Blochwitz is the name of a village, now part of Lampertswalde, Germany. It is also a surname. People have included:
 
 Hans Peter Blochwitz (born 1949), German operatic tenor
 Steffen Blochwitz (born 1967), retired cyclist from East Germany
 Wolfgang Blochwitz (1941–2005), football goalkeeper from East Germany

Surnames